Launch Area 3 (LA-3) at the Wallops Flight Facility is a launch complex which was used, mostly by Scout rockets, between 1960 and 1985. Forty-one Scout launches occurred from the complex, making both orbital and suborbital. In addition, four Nike sounding rockets were launched from the complex in 1970.

Launch Area 3 contains two launch pads, Area 3 and Area 3A. Area 3, also known as the Mk.I launcher, was used by eighteen Scout rockets between 1960 and 1964. The first launch from the complex, on 18 April 1960, was the maiden flight of the Scout launch vehicle, using the Scout X configuration. The last Scout launch from the pad occurred on 6 November 1964. On 7 March 1970, a Nike-Apache and four Nike-Iroquois rockets were launched from the complex.

The upgraded Launch Area 3A, or Mk.II launcher, replaced the original Launch Area 3. It was used for twenty-three Scout launches, starting on 20 July 1964. The last launch from the complex occurred on 13 December 1985.

See also 

 Cape Canaveral Launch Complex 18
 San Marco platform
 Vandenberg Space Launch Complex 5

References 

 
 
 

Rocket launch sites in the United States
Buildings and structures in Accomack County, Virginia
1960 establishments in Virginia